Irwin Shepard (5 July 1843 – 17 April 1916) was a first sergeant in the United States Army who earned the Medal of Honor for gallantry during the American Civil War. On 20 November 1863, he volunteered to join a group of men who were tasked with burning down several farm buildings that Confederate sharpshooters were using to shoot at Union units near Knoxville, Tennessee. For the successful completion of this task, Shepard was awarded the Medal of Honor on 3 August 1897.

Personal life 
Shepard was born in Skaneateles, New York, to parents Luman Shepard and Betsy L. Pangburn. He was of mixed English (father's side) and Dutch (mother's side) ancestry. When Shepard was 13, his family moved to Chelsea, Michigan. In 1859, he entered the Michigan State Normal School in Ypsilanti. After the war, Shepard received A.B., A.M., and PhD degrees from Olivet College in Olivet, Michigan. After graduating, Shepard became the Superintendent of Schools in Charles City, Iowa, in 1871. He married Mary Bassett Elmer in 1871 and fathered three children, of which two boys survived to adulthood, with one of them, Elmer, eventually becoming an assistant professor of mathematics at Williams College in Williamstown, Massachusetts.

Shepard moved to Winona, Minnesota, in 1875 to become the principal of Winona High School. In 1878 he was appointed Superintendent of the Winona Public School System and in 1879 he was appointed President of the Winona State Normal School. He later established the first kindergarten program west of the Mississippi River and the first training course for kindergarten teachers west of the Mississippi. Finally, he established a "Normal School diploma" that granted teachers the qualification to teach in the Normal School system.

In 1893, Shepard became the secretary of the National Educational Association. He was also a member of the John Ball Post No. 45 G.A.R., Department of Minnesota. He died on 17 April 1916 in Winona and is buried in Woodlawn Cemetery in Winona.

Military service 
Shepard enlisted in the Army as a private in 1861 and served with Company E of the 17th Michigan Volunteer Infantry. He was soon promoted to the rank of corporal. On 20 November 1863, Corporal Shepard volunteered for a mission to burn buildings of the Judge Reese farm near Fort Sanders, Knoxville, Tennessee, which the Confederates were using to shoot at Union troops. A Confederate sniper shooting at Shepard's group from above resulted in orders to retreat. However, Shepard stayed behind and ensured the complete destruction of the buildings. This action led to his Medal of Honor. Shepard also fought in the battles of South Mountain, Antietam, Brandy Station, Fredericksburg, Green River, Vicksburg, Jackson, Loudan, and The Wilderness. He was wounded at the Battle of the Wilderness but eventually recovered.

Shepard's Medal of Honor citation reads:

References 

American Civil War recipients of the Medal of Honor
United States Army Medal of Honor recipients
1843 births
1916 deaths
People of New York (state) in the American Civil War